The Bolivarian Games are a multinational sporting event which began in 1938. It has featured baseball 14 times, most recently in 2017.

Results

Medal table

References

Bolivarian
Bolivarian Games
Bolivarian Games